Africa was a Roman province on the northern African coast that was established in 146 BC following the defeat of Carthage in the Third Punic War. It roughly comprised the territory of present-day Tunisia, the northeast of Algeria, and the coast of western Libya along the Gulf of Sirte. The territory was originally inhabited by Berber people, known in Latin as Mauri indigenous to all of North Africa west of Egypt; in the 9th century BC, Phoenicians built settlements along the Mediterranean Sea to facilitate shipping, of which Carthage rose to dominance in the 8th century BC until its conquest by the Roman Republic.

It was one of the wealthiest provinces in the western part of the Roman Empire, second only to Italy. Apart from the city of Carthage, other large settlements in the province were Hadrumetum (modern Sousse, Tunisia), capital of Byzacena, and Hippo Regius (modern Annaba, Algeria).

History 

Rome's first province in northern Africa was established by the Roman Republic in 146 BC, following its elimination of Carthage by Scipio Aemilianus in the Third Punic War. It is possible that the name "Africa" comes from the Berber word "afer", "ifri" or "Aourigha" (whose name would have been pronounced Afarika) that designated a tribe.

Utica, which had fought on the side of the Romans in the war, was formed as the administrative capital. The remaining territory was left in the domain of the Berber Numidian client king Massinissa. At this time, the Roman policy in Africa was simply to prevent another great power from rising on the Northwest Africa.

In 118 BC, the Numidian prince Jugurtha attempted to reunify the smaller kingdoms. However, upon his death, much of Jugurtha's territory was placed in the control of the Berber Mauritanian client king Bocchus; and, by that time, the romanisation of Africa was firmly rooted.

During Caesar's civil war, Caesar created a new African province from territory taken from the Numidians. The original province was called Africa vetus with the newer province suffixed nova. But during the Second Triumvirate, the two provinces were unified, possibly in 35 BC, in consequence of border conflicts: governors of the province won three triumphs between 34 and 28 BC. Further expansion of the province continued under the emperor Augustus, with conflicts recorded through to AD 6. By 27 BC, Africa was assigned as one of the senatorial provinces in the Augustan settlements and eventually became known as Africa proconsularis, as it was ruled by a proconsul rather than a legate of the emperor.

After Diocletian's administrative reforms, it was split into Africa Zeugitana (which retained the name Africa Proconsularis, as it was governed by a proconsul) in the north, Africa Byzacena (corresponding to eastern Tunisia) to its south, and Africa Tripolitania (corresponding to southern Tunisia and northwest Libya) to the south and southeast of Africa Byzacena, all of which were part of the Dioecesis Africae. Old Africa (Africa Vetus), which generally includes the areas mentioned, was also known by the Romans (Pliny) as Africa propria, of which Carthage was the capital.

The region remained a part of the Roman empire until the Germanic migrations of the 5th century. The Vandals crossed into Northwest Africa from Spain in 429 and overran the area by 439 and founded their own kingdom, including Sicily, Corsica, Sardinia and the Balearics. The Vandals controlled the country as a warrior-elite but faced strong resistance from the native Berbers. The Vandals also persecuted Chalcedonian Roman Africans and Berbers, as the Vandals were adherents of Arianism (the semi-trinitarian doctrines of Arius, a priest of Egypt). Towards the end of the 5th century, the Vandal state fell into decline, abandoning most of the interior territories to the Mauri and other Berber tribes of the region.

In AD 533, Emperor Justinian, using a Vandal dynastic dispute as pretext, sent an army under the general Belisarius to recover Africa. In a short campaign, Belisarius defeated the Vandals, entered Carthage in triumph and re-established Roman rule over the province. The restored Roman administration was successful in fending off the attacks of the Amazigh desert tribes, and by means of an extensive fortification network managed to extend its rule once again to the interior.

The northwest African provinces, together with the Roman possessions in Spain, were grouped into the Praetorian prefecture of Africa, this time separate from Praetorian prefecture of Italy, and transferred to Exarchate of Africa by Emperor Maurice. The Exarchate prospered, and from it resulted the overthrow of the emperor Phocas by Heraclius in 610. Heraclius briefly considered moving the imperial capital from Constantinople to Carthage.

After 640, the exarchate managed to stave off the Muslim Conquest, but in 698, the Muslim Umayyad army from Egypt sacked Carthage and conquered the Exarchate, ending Roman and Christian rule in Northwest Africa.

Timetable 

Legend

 Mauretania Tingitana belonged to Diocese of Spain under Praetorian prefecture of Gaul, rather than Diocese of Africa under Praetorian prefecture of Italy, from Diocletianic provincial reforms to Vandalic conquest, i.e. during the rule of Western Roman Empire in a broader sense.

Roman Africans 

The Roman military presence of Northwest Africa was relatively small, consisting of about 28,000 troops and auxiliaries in Numidia and the two Mauretanian provinces. Starting in the 2nd century AD, these garrisons were manned mostly by local inhabitants. A sizable Latin-speaking population developed that was multinational in background, sharing the northwest African region with those speaking Punic and Berber languages. Imperial security forces began to be drawn from the local population, including the Berbers.

Abun-Nasr, in his A History of the Maghrib, said that "What made the Berbers accept the Roman way of life all the more readily was that the Romans, though a colonizing people who captured their lands by the might of their arms, did not display any racial exclusiveness and were remarkably tolerant of Berber religious cults, be they indigenous or borrowed from the Carthaginians. However, the Roman territory in Africa was unevenly penetrated by Roman culture. Pockets of non-Romanized Berbers continued to exist throughout the Roman period, even such as in the rural areas of the deeply romanised regions of Tunisia and Numidia."

By the end of the Western Roman Empire nearly all of the Maghreb was fully romanised, according to Mommsen in his The Provinces of the Roman Empire. Roman Africans enjoyed a high level of prosperity. This prosperity (and romanisation) touched partially even the populations living outside the Roman limes (mainly the Garamantes and the Getuli), who were reached with Roman expeditions to Sub-Saharan Africa.

Economy 

The prosperity of most towns depended on agriculture. Called the "granary of the empire", Northwest Africa, according to one estimate, produced one million tons of cereals each year, one-quarter of which was exported. Additional crops included beans, figs, grapes, and other fruits. By the 2nd century, olive oil rivaled cereals as an export item. In addition to the cultivation of slaves, and the capture and transporting of exotic wild animals, the principal production and exports included the textiles, marble, wine, timber, livestock, pottery such as African Red Slip, and wool.

The incorporation of colonial cities into the Roman Empire brought an unparalleled degree of urbanization to vast areas of territory, particularly in Northwest Africa. This level of rapid urbanization had a structural impact on the town economy, and artisan production in Roman cities became closely tied to the agrarian spheres of production. As Rome's population grew, so did her demand for Northwest African produce. This flourishing trade allowed the Northwest African provinces to increase artisan production in rapidly developing cities, making them highly organized urban centers. Many Roman cities shared both consumer and producer model city aspects, as artisanal activity was directly related to the economic role cities played in long-distance trade networks.

The urban population became increasingly engaged in the craft and service sectors and less in agrarian employment, until a significant portion of the town's vitality came from the sale or trade of products through middlemen to markets in areas both rural and abroad. The changes that occurred in the infrastructure for agricultural processing, like olive oil and wine production, as trade continued to develop both cities and commerce directly influenced the volume of artisan production. The scale, quality, and demand for these products reached its acme in Roman Northwest Africa.

Pottery production

The Northwest African provinces spanned across regions rich with olive plantations and potters' clay sources, which led to the early development of fine Ancient Roman pottery, especially African Red Slip terra sigillata tableware and clay oil lamp manufacture, as a crucial industry. Lamps provided the most common form of illumination in Rome. They were used for public and private lighting, as votive offerings in temples, lighting at festivals, and as grave goods. As the craft developed and increased in quality and craftsmanship, the Northwest African creations began to rival their Italian and Grecian models and eventually surpassed them in merit and in demand.

The innovative use of molds around the 1st century BC allowed for a much greater variety of shapes and decorative style, and the skill of the lamp maker was demonstrated by the quality of the decoration found typically on the flat top of the lamp, or discus, and the outer rim, or shoulder. The production process took several stages. The decorative motifs were created using small individual molds, and were then added as appliqué to a plain archetype of the lamp. The embellished lamp was then used to make two plaster half molds, one lower half and one upper half mold, and multiple copies were then able to be mass-produced. Decorative motifs ranged according to the lamp's function and to popular taste.

Ornate patterning of squares and circles were later added to the shoulder with a stylus, as well as palm trees, small fish, animals, and flower patterns. The discus was reserved for conventional scenes of gods, goddesses, mythological subjects, scenes from daily life, erotic scenes, and natural images. The strongly Christian identity of post-Roman society in Northwest Africa is exemplified in the later instances of Northwest African lamps, on which scenes of Christian images like saints, crosses, and biblical figures became commonly articulated topics. Traditional mythological symbols had enduring popularity as well, which can be traced back to Northwest Africa's Punic heritage. Many of the early Northwest African lamps that have been excavated, especially those of high quality, have the name of the manufacturer inscribed on the base, which gives evidence of a highly competitive and thriving local market that developed early and continued to influence and bolster the economy.

African Terra Sigillata 
After a period of artisanal, political, and social decline in the 3rd century AD, lamp-making revived and accelerated. The introduction of fine local red-fired clays in the late 4th century triggered this revival. African Red Slip ware (ARS), or African Terra Sigillata, revolutionized the pottery and lamp-making industry.

ARS ware was produced from the last third of the 1st century AD onwards, and was of major importance in the mid-to-late Roman periods. Famous in antiquity as "fine" or high-quality tableware, it was distributed both regionally and throughout the Mediterranean basin along well-established and heavily trafficked trade routes. Northwest Africa's economy flourished as its products were dispersed and demand for its products dramatically increased.

Initially, the ARS lamp designs imitated the simple design of 3rd- to 4th-century courseware lamps, often with globules on the shoulder or with fluted walls. More ornate designs appeared before the early 5th century as demand spurred on the creative process. The development and widespread distribution of ARS finewares marks the most distinctive phase of Northwest African pottery-making.

These characteristic pottery lamps were produced in large quantities by efficiently organized production centers with large-scale manufacturing abilities. They can be attributed to specific pottery-making centers in northern and central Tunisia by way of chemical analysis, allowing archeologists to trace distribution patterns from their source through the regions and across the Mediterranean. Some major ARS centers in central Tunisia are Sidi Marzouk Tounsi, Henchir el-Guellal (Djilma), and Henchir es-Srira, all of which have ARS lamp artifacts attributed to them by the microscopic chemical makeup of the clay fabric as well as macroscopic style prevalent in that region.

Local pottery markets fueled the economy of not only the towns, but the entire region and supported markets abroad. Certain vessel forms, fabrics, and decorative techniques like rouletting, appliqué, and stamped décor, are specific for a certain region and even for a certain pottery center. If neither form nor decoration of the material is identifiable, it is possible to trace an item using chemical analysis, not just to a certain region but even to its place of production by comparing its makeup to a matrix of important northeastern and central Tunisian potteries.

Christianity

See also
 List of Roman governors of Africa
 Ifriqiya
 African Romance
 Lex Manciana
 Fossatum Africae
 Roman limes
 Roman roads in Africa
 Kingdom of Africa

References

Citations

Sources

Further reading

 Orietta Dora Cordovana, Segni e immagini del potere tra antico e tardoantico: I Severi e la provincia Africa proconsularis. Seconda edizione rivista ed aggiornata (Catania: Prisma, 2007) (Testi e studi di storia antica)
 Elizabeth Fentress, "Romanizing the Berbers," Past & Present, 190 (2006), pp. 3–33.
 Erich S. Gruen, Rethinking the Other in Antiquity (Princeton, PUP, 2010), pp. 197–222.
 Lennox Manton, Roman North Africa (1988).
 Susan Raven, Rome in Africa, 3rd ed. (London, 1993).
 Duane R. Roller, The World of Juba II and Kleopatra Selene: Royal Scholarship on Rome's African Frontier (New York and London, Routledge, 2003).
 John Stewart, African states and rulers (2006)
 Dick Whittaker, "Ethnic discourses on the frontiers of Roman Africa", in Ton Derks, Nico Roymans (ed.), Ethnic Constructs in Antiquity: The Role of Power and Tradition (Amsterdam, Amsterdam University Press, 2009) (Amsterdam Archaeological Studies, 13), pp. 189–206.

External links
 Roman Africa at www.unrv.com

 

2nd-century BC establishments
2nd-century BC establishments in the Roman Republic
5th-century disestablishments
5th-century disestablishments in the Roman Empire
140s BC establishments
146 BC
Algeria in the Roman era
Libya in the Roman era
Provinces of the Roman Empire
Roman provinces in Africa
States and territories disestablished in the 5th century
States and territories established in the 2nd century BC
Tunisia in the Roman era